The Nederlandse Spoorwegen (NS) Class 400 was a derivative of the successful Class 200, also built for shunting duties. They were larger than their predecessors, and were built by Werkspoor from probably 1945–1956. They were called "Grote Siks" (big goats). Unlike their predecessors, they were generally unsuccessful and in 10 years were replaced by the larger Series 500 and 600.

0400
Werkspoor locomotives
B locomotives
Diesel locomotives of the Netherlands
Standard gauge locomotives of the Netherlands